Rudolf Elsener (born 18 February 1953) is a retired Swiss football striker.

Honours

Clubs
Grasshopper Club Zürich
Swiss Championship: 1977–78
Swiss League Cup: 1973, 1974–75

FC Zürich
Swiss Championship: 1980–81
Swiss League Cup: 1980–81

Individual
Swiss Footballer of the Year: 1978

References

External links
 
 Rudolf Elsener at eintracht-archiv.de 
 

1953 births
Living people
Footballers from Zürich
Swiss men's footballers
Switzerland international footballers
Swiss expatriate footballers
Swiss expatriate sportspeople in Germany
Grasshopper Club Zürich players
FC Zürich players
Eintracht Frankfurt players
Neuchâtel Xamax FCS players
Yverdon-Sport FC players
Bundesliga players
Expatriate footballers in Germany
Association football forwards